Coolbaugh is a surname of German origin, and an Americanized version of Kühlbach. Notable people with the surname include:

 Bob Coolbaugh (1939–1985), American football wide receiver
 Mike Coolbaugh (1972–2007), American baseball player and coach
 Scott Coolbaugh (born 1966), American baseball player
 Walter W. Coolbaugh (1918–1942), United States Navy officer
 William F. Coolbaugh (1821–1877), American politician and banker from Pennsylvania

References

Surnames of German origin